The Communauté de communes du Pays de Colombey et du Sud Toulois is a French administrative association of communes in the Meurthe-et-Moselle and Vosges departments and in the region of Grand Est, northeastern France. Its seat is in Colombey-les-Belles. Its area is 371.8 km2, and its population was 11,336 in 2019.

Composition 

The association comprises 38 communes, of which 37 are in Meurthe-et-Moselle and one (Vicherey) in Vosges:

 Aboncourt
 Allain
 Allamps
 Bagneux
 Barisey-au-Plain
 Barisey-la-Côte
 Battigny
 Beuvezin
 Blénod-lès-Toul
 Bulligny
 Colombey-les-Belles
 Courcelles
 Crépey
 Crézilles
 Dolcourt
 Favières
 Fécocourt
 Gélaucourt
 Gémonville
 Germiny
 Gibeaumeix
 Grimonviller
 Mont-l'Étroit
 Mont-le-Vignoble
 Moutrot
 Ochey
 Pulney
 Saulxerotte
 Saulxures-lès-Vannes
 Selaincourt
 Thuilley-aux-Groseilles
 Tramont-Émy
 Tramont-Lassus
 Tramont-Saint-André
 Uruffe
 Vandeléville
 Vannes-le-Châtel
 Vicherey

References

External links
 Official website

Colombey
Colombey
Colombey